Herman Augustovich Laroche (also German Avgustovič Laroš; 25 May 1845 in Saint Petersburg – 18 October 1904) was a Russian critic of classical music and composer who was renowned throughout Moscow.

Life 
Herman Laroche was born in St. Petersburg in 1845 in the family of a French teacher. Laroche studied piano with Alexandre Dubuque at the Saint Petersburg Conservatory.  After graduating from the Conservatory in 1866, he worked as a professor of music history and theory at the Moscow Conservatory (1867–1870, 1883–1886) and the Saint Petersburg Conservatory (1872–1875 and 1879).  

Around 1875, Laroche left the St. Petersburg Conservatory; later he again taught at the St. Petersburg and Moscow conservatories. He gave public lectures on the history of music in St. Petersburg with great success; wrote in the "Musical List", "Yearbook of the Imperial Theaters", "News", etc.

From 1898 to 1901, Herman's family lived in house number 9 on Pushkinskaya Street.

Career 
In 1867, his extensive article appeared in the Russkiy Vestnik: "Glinka and his significance in music", published as a separate book in Moscow in 1868. Having moved to St. Petersburg in 1871, where he received a position as a professor of theory, and then of the history of music at the St. Petersburg Conservatory, Laroche became a regular contributor to the Golos newspaper, placing musical and literary feuilletons in it .

Under the editorship of Laroche, a Russian translation by M. I. Tchaikovsky of A. D. Ulybyshev ’s New Biography of Mozart (written in French) was published. Of the musical works of Laroche, the overture to the opera Karmozina and the symphonic allegro stand out. Both works were performed in the symphony collections of the Imperial Russian Musical Society.

References

External links

 Tchaikovsky Research

1845 births
1904 deaths
Russian music critics
Russian composers
Russian male composers
Pupils of Nikolai Zaremba
Saint Petersburg Conservatory alumni
Burials at Tikhvin Cemetery
Academic staff of Moscow Conservatory
Academic staff of Saint Petersburg Conservatory
19th-century composers
19th-century male musicians
19th-century writers from the Russian Empire
19th-century male writers